Spy School (also known as Doubting Thomas) is a 2008 American comedy-drama film, released outside the United States as Doubting Thomas or Lies and Spies. Although a 2008 release, the movie was actually filmed in Albuquerque, New Mexico, in the summer of 2005. The film stars Forrest Landis, and AnnaSophia Robb as the lead characters. The movie focuses on the adventures of Thomas Miller, in his efforts to save the President's daughter from being kidnapped.

Plot
A twelve-year-old boy named Thomas Miller is the school troublemaker. He gets into fights and causes distractions in class, and tells lies. Thomas is seen at the beginning of the movie fighting another student until Principal Hampton intervenes. He is next seen in class with Ms. Bleckner, in which he is assigned detention for goofing off.

While in detention, Ms. Bleckner decides to leave to get her nails polished and her hair done. Thomas sneaks out and goes to the library to read and talk with other students instead. On his way to the library, he overhears an unseen figure discussing a plot to kidnap the President's daughter on a cellphone. Petrified by this thought, Thomas leaves.

Thomas then encounters an FBI agent named Randal. Randal claims to be involved with researching the case and trying to stop it. Thomas explains what happened and the two go and meet up with Albert, a fellow FBI Agent.

Randal, Albert, and Thomas all perceive that the kidnapper is planning on striking during the school dance that weekend. Thomas invites his friend Jackie to go with him, but Principal Hampton and Ms. Bleckner kick them out. They sneak in anyway and continue to search in order to discover the villain.

Albert joins Thomas and Jackie in their search. Meanwhile, Randal goes looking on his own and happens to come across the unseen villain. However, the villain fears being exposed, so Randal is attacked and hit with a broom, and the villain drags him away.

Albert, Thomas and Jackie continue to search the dance floor in search of clues but none arise. However, there is a suspicious feeling lurking about. Meanwhile, Ms. Bleckner is seen walking down the hall, patrolling as a hall monitor; where she hears banging on the door of the janitor's closet. Now suspicious, she opens the closet door and finds Randal inside, bound and gagged. She sets him free, and the two go to stop the janitor, who Randal reveals to be the villain.

Ms. Bleckner and Randal arrive and run onto the dance floor. Ms. Bleckner exclaims that the Janitor is the kidnapper and that she just saved Randal's life. The Janitor is outraged at this, grabs the president's daughter, and flees. Albert, Randal, Thomas, and Jackie chase him down and follow him onto a helicopter. Thomas jumps onto it, sneaks up on the Janitor and knocks him out, and puts the helicopter on autopilot. A SWAT Team and the National Guard appear with military-style assault rifles and get Thomas and the President's Daughter to safety. Thomas is worshipped as a hero and everyone throws a huge celebration.

Cast
 Forrest Landis as Thomas Miller
 AnnaSophia Robb as Jackie Hoffman
 Rider Strong as Randal The Agent
 Lea Thompson as Claire Miller
 D.L. Hughley as Albert The Agent
 Roger Bart as Principal Hampton
 Taylor Momsen as Madison Kramer
 Suzy Nakamura as Ms. Bleckner
 Brian Posehn as Grissom

References

External links
 

2008 films
American children's comedy films
Children's comedy-drama films
2008 comedy-drama films
American comedy-drama films
2000s English-language films
2000s American films